The Väneko is an endangered Swedish breed of dairy cattle. It is named for the village of Väne-Ryr in the landskap of Västergötland, in western Sweden. It is a traditional domestic Swedish breed, and derives from a group of cattle discovered in the 1990s, at a time when all traditional Swedish horned cattle were thought to have disappeared.

History 

The Väneko is a traditional domestic Swedish breed.

It derives from a group of cattle discovered in the 1990s, at a time when all traditional Swedish horned cattle were thought to have disappeared. There is a programme of recovery and conservation of the breed. A herd-book for the breed was established in 1993.

The Väneko is grouped with two other endangered indigenous cattle breeds, the Ringamålako and the Bohuskulla, as Allmogekor, or roughly "Swedish native cattle". Conservation and registration of these populations is managed by a society, the Föreningen Allmogekon.

In 2014 the total Väneko population was reported to be 190.

Characteristics 

The coat of the Väneko is multi-coloured, black or red, sometimes with white; the cattle may be solid-coloured, red or black pied, or colour-sided.

Use 

The Väneko is a dairy breed, kept principally for its milk; it is, however, not very productive. The only breeding aim is preservation of the breed without contamination from other breeds. It is maintained for social and cultural reasons, and may be used in vegetation management.

References

Cattle breeds originating in Sweden
Agriculture in Sweden
Cattle breeds